Celebrity Xploration is a luxury catamaran owned by Celebrity Cruises. As well as Celebrity Xperience, she was previously owned by the Galapagos operator Ocean Adventures. Two vessels joined Celebrity Xpedition operating cruises in this region after extensive refurbishment. 

Celebrity Xploration began sailings under her new flag in March 2017.

Description 
The ship has a tonnage of 319.5 GT and a capacity of 16 guests.

In August 2017, Nathaly Albán became the Xploration's Captain and the 1st woman captain of a cruise ship in the Galapagos region.

Route 
Celebrity Xploration operates voyages around the Galapagos Islands.

References 

Xploration
2017 ships